was a Japanese politician. Elected as a representative of the Liberal Democratic Party, in 1993 he broke away to form New Party Sakigake, before joining the newly formed Democratic Party of Japan in 1997. He served as chief cabinet secretary and then finance minister in the Japanese government of the mid-1990s.

Early life
Takemura was born in Gamō district in Shiga Prefecture to a family of farmers. Initially studying engineering at Nagoya University, he graduated from University of Tokyo studying education and finance. He began his professional life as a bureaucrat in the home affairs ministry.

Political career 

After leaving the ministry, he was elected mayor of Yōkaichi in Shiga Prefecture, and then became the governor of Shiga prefecture and served in the post from 1974 to 1986. He was elected to the Lower House in 1986 as a representative of the Liberal Democratic Party. In 1993 he split from the LDP to found the New Party Sakigake.

He took part in the coalition government of Morihiro Hosokawa as chief cabinet secretary. Then he was appointed finance minister in the coalition cabinet led by Prime Minister Tomiichi Murayama in July 1994. 

Described as "blunt, pragmatic and outspoken", his confrontational tenure at the finance ministry led Euromoney to describe him as "The worst finance minister of the year" for 1995. It has been speculated that his confrontational attitude towards the officials of the Ministry of Finance stem from the manner in which the Hosokawa government fell apart over the introduction of consumption tax, with Ministry of Finance Officials conspiring with Hosokawa to keep coalitions partners in the dark over their plans.

References

1934 births
2022 deaths
Government ministers of Japan
Ministers of Finance of Japan
Governors of Shiga Prefecture
Mayors of places in Japan
Chief Cabinet Secretaries of Japan
Liberal Democratic Party (Japan) politicians
New Party Sakigake politicians
Democratic Party of Japan politicians
Nagoya University alumni
People from Shiga Prefecture
University of Tokyo alumni